Fernando León y Castillo, Marqués del Muni (Telde, Canary Islands, 1842 - Biarritz, France, 1918) was a Spanish politician and diplomat, he decided on an intervention of Spain and North Africa.

He went to Madrid and collaborated in liberal publications in the late years of Isabella II.  From the Revolution of 1868, he was nominated a governor of Granada and Valencia.

He was successively elected deputy and senator, in 1874 he was named the overseas sub-secretary.

After the restoration with Sagasta as ministry of overseas (Prime Minister several times including 1881-1883 (1886–1887).  In 1887, he became ambassador to France until 1918.

He participated in the Algeciras Conference in 1906

1842 births
1918 deaths
People from Telde
Liberal Party (Spain, 1880) politicians
Government ministers of Spain
Members of the Congress of Deputies (Spain)
Members of the Congress of Deputies of the Spanish Restoration
Members of the Senate of Spain
Politicians from the Canary Islands
Ambassadors of Spain to France
Knights of the Golden Fleece of Spain